Soulfire  is a solo album by Tom Hingley, the ex-frontman of Inspiral Carpets.

Track listing 

"Happiness"
"Isolation Tank"
"Transparent"
"Inertia"
"Got You Love"
"Formal Tourist"
"Work Rest And Play"
"Manmade"
"Soul Fire"
"Broken Wings"
"Pimp"

External links 
Townsend Records
Soulfire in Amazon Music

2000 albums
Tom Hingley albums